Maj. James Scarborough House is a historic plantation house located near Saratoga, Wilson County, North Carolina.  It was built about 1821, and is a two-story, five bay, Federal style frame dwelling with a rear shed addition and exterior end chimneys.  It has a one-story rear kitchen wing connected by a breezeway.  Also on the property is a contributing latticed well-house.

It was listed on the National Register of Historic Places in 1982.

References

Plantation houses in North Carolina
Houses on the National Register of Historic Places in North Carolina
Federal architecture in North Carolina
Houses completed in 1821
Houses in Wilson County, North Carolina
National Register of Historic Places in Wilson County, North Carolina